Chen Chiung-Yi (born 7 November 1976) is a road cyclist from Taiwan. She represented her nation as Chinese Taipei at the 2000 Summer Olympics in the women's road race.

References

External links
 profile at sports-reference.com

Taiwanese female cyclists
Cyclists at the 2000 Summer Olympics
Olympic cyclists of Taiwan
Living people
1976 births